Zygmunt Szweykowski (7 April 1894 in Krośniewice – 11 February 1978 in Poznań) was a historian of Polish literature who specialized in 19th-century Polish prose.

Life
In 1932-39, Szweykowski held a professorship at the Free Polish University (Wolna Wszechnica Polska) in Warsaw and Łódź.

During the World War II Nazi occupation of Poland, he participated, at the risk of his life, in underground university teaching in Warsaw.

From 1946 he held a chair at Poznań University. In 1950 he was inducted into the Polish Academy of Learning, and in 1951 into the Polish Academy of Sciences.

Szweykowski studied the 19th-century Polish novel. His books in this field included Powieści historyczne Henryka Rzewuskiego (The Historical Novels of Henryk Rzewuski, 1922) and Trylogia Sienkiewicza (Sienkiewicz's Trilogy, 1961).

His specialty, however, was the writings of Bolesław Prus. His books on Prus include Tworczość Bolesława Prusa (The Art of Bolesław Prus, 1947; 2nd ed., 1972) and Nie tylko o Prusie:  szkice (Not Only about Prus:  Sketches, 1967).
  
Beginning in 1948, Szweykowski produced monumental editions of Prus' collected Pisma (Writings). He also edited Krystyna Tokarzówna's and Stanisław Fita's exhaustive Bolesław Prus, 1847-1912:  Kalendarz życia i twórczości (Bolesław Prus, 1847-1912:  a Calendar of [His] Life and Work), Warsaw, Państwowy Instytut Wydawniczy, 1969.

Works
 Powieści historyczne Henryka Rzewuskiego (The Historical Novels of Henryk Rzewuski, 1922)
 "Lalka" Bolesława Prusa (Bolesław Prus' The Doll, 1927)
 Twórczość Bolesława Prusa (The Creative Writing of Bolesław Prus, 1947, 1972)
 "Trylogia" Henryka Sienkiewicza. Szkice (Henryk Sienkiewicz's Trilogy: Sketches, 1961)
 Nie tylko o Prusie (Not Only about Prus, 1967)
 "Trylogia" Sienkiewicza i inne szkice o twórczości pisarza (Sienkiewicz's Trilogy and Other Sketches about the Writer's Works, 1973)

See also
List of Poles

Notes

References
"Szweykowski, Zygmunt," Encyklopedia powszechna PWN (PWN Universal Encyclopedia), vol. 4, Warsaw, Państwowe Wydawnictwo Naukowe, 1976, p. 370.

20th-century Polish historians
Polish male non-fiction writers
1894 births
1978 deaths
20th-century Polish male writers